Melaleuca wilsonii, commonly known as Wilson's honey-myrtle or violet honey-myrtle, is a plant in the myrtle family, Myrtaceae, native to parts of South Australia and Victoria. It is a shrub with narrow, pointed leaves and heads of purplish-pink flowers on the sides of the branches. It is adaptable to a wide range of soils, frost hardy and often cultivated.

Description

The stamens are arranged in bundles of five around each flower with 6 to 15 stamens per bundle. The petals are brown,  and deciduous.

Taxonomy and naming
Melaleuca wilsonii was first formally described in 1861 by Victorian State Botanist Ferdinand von Mueller in Fragmenta phytographiae Australiae from specimens collected by Reverend Julian Tenison-Woods in desert country near Tatiara and in the desert around Lake Hindmarsh by John Dallachy. The specific epithet (wilsonii) is a reference to a Charles Wilson, a friend of Mueller who apparently had some role in drawing the species to the botanist's attention.  It is a member of Melaleuca, a large and diverse genus whose members range from large trees such as M. quinquenervia, to small shrubs.

Distribution and habitat
This melaleuca occurs from the south-east corner of South Australia to western and central Victoria. It grows in seasonally flooded and poorly drained soils in open scrubland, eucalypt forest and mallee heath.

Uses

Horticulture
This species is often cultivated, thriving in light to heavy soils and preferring a sunny, well-drained position. It is frost- and drought tolerant. It may flower less in humid areas and the flowers that appear wilt quickly. It was brought into cultivation in England in 1874 and is rarely seen in the United States. The flowers attract birds and insects. It is highly regarded as a horticultural subject. Melaleuca wilsonii can be propagated by seed or cutting.

Essential oils
The leaves of this shrub contain monoterpenes including 1,8-cineole but the amount is low.

References 

Endemic flora of Australia
Flora of South Australia
Flora of Victoria (Australia)
Garden plants of Australia
wilsonii
Myrtales of Australia
Plants described in 1861
Taxa named by Ferdinand von Mueller